Anne Keothavong was the defending champion, but retired at the end of 2013.

Claire Feuerstein won the tournament, defeating Renata Voráčová in the final, 6–3, 4–6, 6–4.

Seeds

Main draw

Finals

Top half

Bottom half

References 
 Main draw

Open GDF Suez Seine-et-Marne - Singles